The 1949 New Zealand Māori rugby union tour was a collection of rugby union games undertaken by the New Zealand Māori against invitational and national teams of Australia.

The Maoris plays 11 match, winning 9 of them and losing only one (1 tied).

Three test matches against Australia were played. The victory in the first match against the "Wallabies" was clamorous and the Australian coach Johnny Wallace was fired. The new coach was Bill McLean, historical captain of the 1947-48 tour in Europe. For the first time, the Australian team was directed by a coach from Queensland and not from New South Wales.

The matches 

Scores and results list NZ Maoris' points tally first.

Notes and references 

1949
1949 rugby union tours
1949 in New Zealand rugby union
1949
1949 in Australian rugby union